Luigi Beghetto (born 6 July 1973 in Bassano del Grappa, Province of Vicenza) is an Italian footballer who played as a striker.

Career 
Beghetto started his career with hometown club Bassano, then in Serie D. He was then signed by Vicenza in July 1994, but was sold to Serie C1's Carpi on October without making a single appearance for his previous club. He then went on to play on several Serie B and Serie C1 teams, most notably Treviso (from 1998 and 2000) and Cagliari in 2000–01.

In October 2001 he was signed by Chievo, making his debut in the Serie A at the age of 28. In 2003, after two unremarkable seasons with the Verona-based club, Beghetto returned to play at Serie B level, this time with Piacenza, where he established himself as a key player for the Emilian club. In 2005, he returned to Treviso, joining the biancazzurri in their first ever Serie A campaign, however he did not manage to confirm his previous performances with Piacenza and scoring only once in the 2005–06 season, ended with Treviso being promptly relegated back to Serie B. In the following seasons with Treviso, Beghetto became one of the team mainstays as one of the most experienced players in the roster. In January 2009, 35-year-old Beghetto accepted to join Swiss Super League club AC Bellinzona in a permanent move.

Personal life
Luigi's father Giuseppe is a former Olympic gold-medalist cyclist, his brother Massimo is a former footballer and current footballing coach, and his nephew Andrea is a professional footballer for Genoa.

References

External links 
 Bellinzona Profile 

Italian footballers
Italian expatriate footballers
Expatriate footballers in Switzerland
Italian expatriate sportspeople in Switzerland
Association football forwards
Living people
1973 births
Serie A players
Serie B players
Serie C players
L.R. Vicenza players
S.S. Fidelis Andria 1928 players
Cagliari Calcio players
Treviso F.B.C. 1993 players
Delfino Pescara 1936 players
Genoa C.F.C. players
A.C. ChievoVerona players
Piacenza Calcio 1919 players
AC Bellinzona players
Bassano Virtus 55 S.T. players